Westfield Township is one of the sixteen townships of Morrow County, Ohio, United States.  The 2020  census found 1,226 people in the township.

Geography
Located in the southwestern corner of the county, it borders the following townships:
Cardington Township - northeast
Lincoln Township - east
Peru Township - southeast
Oxford Township, Delaware County - south
Marlboro Township, Delaware County - southwest
Waldo Township, Marion County - west
Richland Township, Marion County - northwest

No municipalities are located in Westfield Township.

Name and history
Westfield Township was organized in 1822. Statewide, the only other Westfield Township is located in Medina County.

Government
The township is governed by a three-member board of trustees, who are elected in November of odd-numbered years to a four-year term beginning on the following January 1. Two are elected in the year after the presidential election and one is elected in the year before it. There is also an elected township fiscal officer, who serves a four-year term beginning on April 1 of the year after the election, which is held in November of the year before the presidential election. Vacancies in the fiscal officership or on the board of trustees are filled by the remaining trustees.

References

External links
County website

Townships in Morrow County, Ohio
Townships in Ohio
1822 establishments in Ohio
Populated places established in 1822